Tectonophysics, The International Journal of Geotectonics and the Geology and Physics of the Interior of the Earth is a weekly peer-reviewed scientific journal published by Elsevier. It was established in 1964 and covers the field of tectonophysics, including kinematics, structure, composition, and dynamics of the solid Earth at all scales.

Organization 
The editors-in-chief are  Philippe Agard (Pierre and Marie Curie University), Jean-Philippe Avouac (California Institute of Technology), Ramon Carbonell (Spanish National Research Council), Rob Govers (Utrecht University), Zheng Xiang Li (Curtin University), and Kelin Wang (Geological Survey of Canada).

Abstracting and indexing 
This journal is abstracted and indexed in over fifty databases, including Current Contents, GeoRef, Inspec, Scopus and Web of Science.

Notable articles 
According to the Journal Citation Reports, Tectonophysics has a 2011 impact factor of 2.433. The three most highly cited papers in Tectonophysics as of September 2011 are:

References

External links 
 

Publications established in 1964
Geophysics journals
Geology journals
Elsevier academic journals
Weekly journals
English-language journals